Grace Academy is a non-selective co-educational secondary school within the English Academy programme, at Chelmsley Wood, Solihull, West Midlands.

It opened in 2006 and replaced the old Whitesmore School. It is a specialist Business and Enterprise college.

Grace Academy Solihull is constituted as a company and registered charity under English law.

In 2009 the school achieved average results for Key Stage 2 to Key Stage 4 but only 28% achieved 5 or more GCSEs grade C or above compared to a national average of 47.6%.

See also
 Grace Academy (Coventry)
 Grace Academy (Darlaston)
 List of schools in Solihull

References

External links

Educational institutions established in 2006
Academies in Solihull
Secondary schools in Solihull
2006 establishments in England